The Guild of the Holy Cross could refer to:

Guild of the Holy Cross (Birmingham)
Guild of the Holy Cross (Stratford-upon-Avon)